The 1946 Holy Cross Crusaders football team was an American football team that represented the College of the Holy Cross as an independent during the 1946 college football season.  In its second year under head coach Ox DaGrosa, the team compiled a 5–4 record. 

The Crusaders led the nation in passing defense, giving up only 53.7 passing yards per game. They also ranked thirteenth in total defense, allowing 178.8 yards per game.

The team played its home games at Fitton Field in Worcester, Massachusetts.

Schedule

After the season

The 1947 NFL Draft was held on December 16, 1946. The following Crusaders were selected.

References

Holy Cross
Holy Cross Crusaders football seasons
Holy Cross Crusaders football